
Gmina Syców is an urban-rural gmina (administrative district) in Oleśnica County, Lower Silesian Voivodeship, in south-western Poland. It is part of the Wrocław metropolitan area.

Neighbouring gminas
Gmina Syców is bordered by the gminas of Dziadowa Kłoda, Kobyla Góra, Międzybórz, Oleśnica, Perzów and Twardogóra.

Villages
Apart from the town of Syców, the gmina contains the villages of Bielawki, Biskupice, Błotnik, Dłusko, Drołtowice, Działosza, Gaszowice, Komorów, Lesieniec, Ligota Dziesławska, Maliszów, Niwki Garbarskie, Nowy Dwór, Nowy Świat, Pawełki, Pawłowice, Radzyna, Ślizów, Stradomia Wierzchnia, Święty Marek, Szczodrów, Trzy Chałupy, Widawki, Wielowieś, Wioska, Wojciechowo Wielkie, Zawada, Zawady and Zieleniec.

Twin towns – sister cities

Gmina Syców is twinned with:
 Malsch, Germany

References

Sycow
Oleśnica County